Neubiberg is a municipality and a village in south-east of Munich, Germany, founded in 1912. It used to have an airport that was used as a Luftwaffe-base in the Third Reich and after the war as a U.S. airbase and in the following years as the German Air Force officer school. Today, the largest part of the area is used by Bundeswehr University Munich. Neubiberg consists mainly of semi-detached and detached houses and has many gardens. The village of Unterbiberg is part of the municipality. It hosts the headquarters of Infineon Technologies (Campeon) located in the west of Unterbiberg as well as the headquarters of Intel Deutschland GmbH, a wireless semiconductor business.

Churches and parishes 
 Maria Rosenkranzkönigin (Neubiberg) (Roman Catholic church)

Twin towns

Ablon-sur-Seine in France
Chernogolovka in Russia

References

External links
Official Homepage
Local High School (Gymnasium Neubiberg)

 
Munich (district)